Daf also known as Dâyere and Riq is a Middle Eastern (mainly Iranian) frame drum musical instrument, used in popular and classical music in South and Central Asia. It is also used in Afghanistan, Azerbaijan, Tajikistan, Iran, Uzbekistan, many regions of Georgia, Pakistan as well as in parts of India and Russian polar regions. It is also popular among Balkans, Bukharan Jews, Caucasians, Kurds,  and Macedonians.

Daf is the national musical instrument of Pakistan and is also depicted on the reverse and obverse of the Azerbaijani 1 qəpik coin and 1 manat banknote respectively, since 2006.

It traditionally has a round wooden frame (although in the modern era it may also be made of metal), jingles, and a thin, translucent head made of fish or goat skin (or, more recently, a synthetic material). The sound is produced by hitting the membrane with either hand – the left hand, which also holds the Daf, strikes the edges, and the right hand strikes the center. The right-hand fingers are fastened about their neighbours and suddenly released (like the action of finger-snapping) to produce loud, rapid, sharp sounds.

History

The Pahlavi (an ancient Iranian language) name of the daf is dap. Some pictures of daf have been found in paintings that date before the Common Era. The presence of the Iranian daf in the 6th–5th century BCE Behistun Inscription suggests that it existed before the rise of Islam and Sufism. Iranian music has always been a spiritual tool. It shows that daf played an important role in Mazdean Iran emerging as an important element during the Sassanian period during the Kâvusakân dynasty. Also, there is a kind of square frame drum in the stonecutting of Taq-e Bostan (another famous monument located 5km northeast of Kermanshah city). These frame drums were played in the ancient Middle East (chiefly by women in Kurdish societies), Greece, and Rome and reached medieval Europe through Islamic culture.

Nowruz (the first day of the Iranian New Year and the national festival of the Iranian people) and other festive occasions have been accompanied by daf in the Sassanid periods (224 AD–651 AD). In this period the daf was played in order to accompany Iranian classical music. Dafs were likely used in the court to be played in the modes and melodies of traditional music. This traditional or classical music was created by Barbod the Great and was named the khosravani after the mythical king Khosrow. Recent research reveals that these modes were used in the recitation of Mazdean (Zoroastrian) prayers. The modes were passed down from master to student and are today known as the radif and dastgah system. Many of the melodies were lost, but most of those that remain date to the Sassanid period. Dafs can be played to produce highly complex and intense rhythms, causing one to go under a trance and reach an ecstatic and spiritually-high state. For this reason, they have always been connected with religion in Iran.

An engraved bronze cup from Lorestān at the National Museum of Iran in Tehran, portrays a double ney (end-blown reed pipes), chang (harp), and a daf in a shrine or court processional, as similarly documented in Egypt, Elam, and the Persian province of Babylonia where music was arranged for performance by large orchestral ensembles.

The Arabs introduced the daf and other Middle Eastern musical instruments to Spain, and the Spanish adapted and promoted the daf and other musical instruments (such as the guitar) in medieval Europe. In the 15th century, the daf was only used in Sufi ceremonies; the Ottomans reintroduced it to Europe in the 17th century.

The daf still functions as an important part of Iranian music (both traditional and classical) as it did in ancient times. It successfully encourages many young Iranians to take up learning this ancient instrument.

Daf, and its smaller version called dafli, is also used across India. It is believed to have arrived along with other Persian influences in the medieval era, and is a popular folk instrument. In southern India, its use became mainstream, especially in protests, during the early half of the 20th century. Since the 1950s, it has also been used prominently in Bollywood.

In Islam 
In Islam, Daf holds special importance because some Muslims believe that it is the only musical instrument which is permitted to be used. The Prophet of Islam, Muhammad, did not impose any restrictions on using the daf. It has always been an important part of Islamic Sufi music.

Structure and construction
The jingles which are thin metal plates or rings, are attached to hooks in three or four rectangular holes in the circular wooden frame. The drumhead is made of fish or goat skin. The width of the frame is 45–50 cm (18–20 in.) and the depth, 5–7 cm (2–3 in.). In order to bend the frame, the wood ("buka", "orev") may be softened in water before being bent around a hot metal cylinder. The frame is closed by gluing the ends together. Finally, the skin is attached to the frame by fixing it with another wooden frame or by using nails. Another variation is to have the ring-style jingles arranged around the edge of the inside of the drum the whole way around or to have several tiers half way around the inside edge.

See also

Tar (drum)
Bodhrán
Bendir
Mazhar
Davul
 Innaby, Azerbaijani dance

References

External links
 
 
 

Hand drums
Medicine drums
Asian percussion instruments
Sufi music
Persian words and phrases
Kurdish musical instruments
Persian musical instruments
Iranian inventions
Pakistani musical instruments